The 1995 World Taekwondo Championships were the 12th edition of the World Taekwondo Championships, and were held in Manila, Philippines from November 17 to November 21, 1995, with 598 athletes participating from 77 countries.

Medal summary

Men

Women

Medal table

References

WTF Medal Winners

World
World Taekwondo Championships
World Taekwondo Championships
Taekwondo Championships